"Rain Rain Go Away" is a song released by Bobby Vinton in August 1962.

Background
The song is sung from the perspective of a man who is wishing his childhood sweetheart sunshine after she asks to be set free so that she can marry another.
Epic Records was attempting to have Bobby Vinton's follow-up recording follow the various tropes established by "Roses Are Red" (a "singalong" melody with a sentimental storyline) - but for reasons of his own, Bobby was uninterested in the song.  He had already written and recorded "Mr. Lonely", intending that song to be his follow up single; to his shock, he found the label was also giving the song to Buddy Greco, whom the label was grooming to be their next superstar. To Epic, "Roses Are Red" was something of a fluke, with Bobby's true talent laying more in the direction of songwriting as opposed to singing. Bobby was out touring the country enjoying the big success of "Roses Are Red", and without awareness to the fact that Epic had already released "Rain" as his follow-up; he reflected on its chart positioning thus: "Deep down inside, I knew that 'Rain' wasn't number one material."

Chart performance
In the US, the song spent 11 weeks on the Billboard Hot 100 chart, peaking at No. 12, while reaching No. 4 on Billboard's Easy Listening chart, 
Outside the US, "Rain Rain Go Away" went to No. 11 on Canada's CHUM Hit Parade, and No. 10 in Israel.

References

1962 songs
1962 singles
Bobby Vinton songs
Epic Records singles
Songs written by Gloria Shayne Baker
Songs written by Noël Regney